
Góra County is a unit of territorial administration and local government (powiat) in Lower Silesian Voivodeship, south-western Poland. It came into being on January 1, 1999, as a result of the Polish local government reforms passed in 1998. Its administrative seat is the town of Góra; the only other town in the county is Wąsosz.

As of 2019 the total population of the county is 35,047, out of which the population of Góra is 11,797, the population of Wąsosz is 2,662, and the rural population is 20,588.

Neighbouring counties
Góra County is bordered by Leszno County to the north, Rawicz County to the east, Trzebnica County to the south-east, Wołów County to the south, Lubin County to the south-west, Głogów County to the west and Wschowa County to the north-west.

Administrative division
The county is subdivided into four gminas (two urban-rural and two rural). These are listed in the following table, in descending order of population.

References

 
Land counties of Lower Silesian Voivodeship